The 2020–21 Oakland Roots SC season was the club's second in the National Independent Soccer Association (NISA) and second overall.

On September 15, 2020, Oakland announced that it would be joining the second division USL Championship in 2021. The Roots became the fourth NISA team to cease league play during an on-going season and second to-do so in order to join the USLC after Miami FC made the same jump one year prior.

Roster

Players

Staff
  Jordan Ferrell – Head coach
  Dario Pot – Assistant coach
  Kristopher Hall – Assistant coach
  Yuta Tanaka – Strength and conditioning coach

Transfers

In

Out

Justice Match 
On July 30, 2020, Oakland announced it would be hosting and broadcasting a special event prior to the regular season start called the "Justice Match" on August 29. The scrimmage featured Roots players mixed into two teams with retired local women's professional players and local women’s soccer ambassadors that both played and coached, including former USWNT player Aly Wagner, Miranda Nild of the Thailand women's national football team, and former Afghanistan captain Hailai Arghandiwal.

The event was postponed on August 26 due to unhealthy air quality from the 2020 California wildfires. It was later rescheduled for October 10.

Competitions

NISA Fall Season 

On June 4, NISA announced details for the 2020 Fall Season. The eight member teams would be split into conferences, Eastern and Western, with the Roots playing in the later.

The Fall regular season schedule was announced on July 31, 2020. The team is set to play two regular season games, both on the road, against the rest of the Western Conference.

Standings

Results summary

Matches

Fall Playoffs

All eight NISA teams qualified for the 2020 Fall tournament, which will be hosted at Keyworth Stadium in Detroit, Michigan, beginning on September 21 ending with the final on October 2.

Group stage

Knockout stage

Squad statistics

Appearances and goals 

|-
! colspan="16" style="background:#dcdcdc; text-align:center"| Goalkeepers

|-
! colspan="16" style="background:#dcdcdc; text-align:center"| Defenders

|-
! colspan="16" style="background:#dcdcdc; text-align:center"| Midfielders

|-
! colspan="16" style="background:#dcdcdc; text-align:center"| Forwards

|-
|}

Goal scorers

Disciplinary record

Notes

References

External links 

 

2020
Oakland Roots
Oakland Roots
Oakland Roots
Oakland Roots